Journal de l'île de La Réunion is a daily, French-language newspaper published in Réunion, a French overseas department. The newspaper, which was founded in 1951 is headquartered in Saint-Denis, Réunion, is owned by Groupe Hersant Média. There are four competing newspapers in Réunion.

External links
Journal de l'île de La Réunion

Newspapers published in Réunion
Mass media in Réunion
Publications established in 1951
1951 establishments in Réunion